Klingner is a German surname. Notable people with the surname include:

Bernd Klingner (born 1940), German sports shooter
Friedrich Klingner (1894–1968), German classical philologist
Walter Klingner (born 1961), German oboist and cor anglais player

German-language surnames